Giuseppe Tricarico (1623 in Gallipoli – 1697) was an Italian church and opera composer. He served as Kapellmeister to the dowager empress Eleonora in Vienna 1660–1663.

References

1623 births
1697 deaths
17th-century Italian composers
Italian opera composers
Male opera composers
17th-century male musicians